Slovakia competed at the 2011 World Aquatics Championships in Shanghai, China between July 16 and 31, 2011.

Swimming

Slovakia qualified 4 swimmers.

Men

Women

Synchronised swimming

Slovakia has qualified 3 athletes in synchronised swimming.

Women

References

2011 in Slovak sport
Nations at the 2011 World Aquatics Championships
Slovakia at the World Aquatics Championships